South Dakota Highway 50 (SD 50) is a state route serving south central and southeast South Dakota. The current alignment begins at the junction of South Dakota Highway 34 at "Lee's Corner" east of Fort Thompson, and ends at the Iowa border near Richland, where it continues as Iowa Highway 3.

History
SD 50 was designated on the route known as the Sunshine Highway. When it was formed in the 1920s, it traveled the entire length of southern South Dakota, from the Wyoming state line west of Edgemont, to the Iowa state line at Sioux City.

When U.S. Route 18 (US 18) was designated in the late 1920s, it replaced the SD 50 designation from the Wyoming state line at Ravinia (east of Lake Andes). SD 50 continued in southeast South Dakota.

Around 1940, SD 50 was extended northwest of its former terminus. It assumed a portion of alignment of SD 45 through Geddes, and SD 47 through Academy; the northern terminus became US 16 near Pukwana.  

Around 1950, the eastern terminus was rerouted. At US 77 (with which it had previously shared a concurrency to Sioux City), SD 50 was extended east to the Iowa state line.  

In 1975, the northwestern terminus was again extended. It was routed west to Chamberlain, then assumed a segment of SD 47 (which had been realigned west) to its new northern terminus at SD 34 east of Fort Thompson.

Major intersections

References

External links

South Dakota Highways Page: Highways 31-60

050
Transportation in Buffalo County, South Dakota
Transportation in Brule County, South Dakota
Transportation in Charles Mix County, South Dakota
Transportation in Bon Homme County, South Dakota
Transportation in Yankton County, South Dakota
Transportation in Clay County, South Dakota
Transportation in Union County, South Dakota
U.S. Route 18
U.S. Route 16